Titley Junction railway station was a station in Titley, Herefordshire, England. The station was located nearly two miles south of Titley village.

The station was opened in 1856 and closed completely in 1964. Immediately to the east of the station, the line split for trains traveling south to Eardisley (at least until 1940, when that portion of the line closed) and north-west to Presteigne, Wales. Since closure the station has been restored with track reinstated as a short private railway.

Charles Beeks started his GWR career at Titley Junction as a porter before joining the Royal Flying Corps. For his service in the trenches, Charles Beeks was awarded the Mons Star and King Albert’s Belgian Cross. He received the Distinguished Flying Medal for his flying heroism. He never returned back to the railway and settled in Oxfordshire, the family and relatives still continued to live in Herefordshire and Worcestershire.

References

Further reading

Disused railway stations in Herefordshire
Railway stations in Great Britain opened in 1856
Railway stations in Great Britain closed in 1955
Former Great Western Railway stations
1856 establishments in England
1955 disestablishments in England